Banchus is a genus of parasitoid wasps belonging to the family Ichneumonidae.

The genus was first described by Fabricius in 1798.

The species of this genus are found in Europe and Northern America.

Species:
 Banchus dilatatorius
 Banchus falcatorius

References

Ichneumonidae
Ichneumonidae genera